Johann Christian Eberlein (1770–1815), a German painter, was born at Göttingen about 1770, and died there in 1815. An Italian Landscape by him is in the Modern Gallery at Munich.

See also
 List of German painters

References
 

1770 births
1815 deaths
18th-century German painters
18th-century German male artists
German male painters
19th-century German painters
19th-century German male artists
Artists from Göttingen